Nimiq-4 is a Canadian geosynchronous communications satellite. It was launched aboard a Proton-M / Briz-M launch vehicle at 21:48:00 UTC on 19 September 2008. It was positioned at 82.0° West longitude, and operated by Telesat Canada.

Spacecraft 
The satellite was constructed by EADS Astrium, using a Eurostar-3000S bus. It carries 40 transponders, 32 of which operate in the Ku-band, and 8 which operate in the Ka-band. It provides digital HDTV to Canada and United States.

See also 

 Nimiq

References 

Communications satellites in geostationary orbit
Spacecraft launched in 2008
Satellites using the Eurostar bus